Abhishek Pandey (born 11 October 1999) is an Indian cricketer. He made his Twenty20 debut on 10 January 2021, for Railways in the 2020–21 Syed Mushtaq Ali Trophy. He made his List A debut on 28 February 2021, for Railways in the 2020–21 Vijay Hazare Trophy.

References

External links
 

1999 births
Living people
Indian cricketers
Railways cricketers
Place of birth missing (living people)